Gloria is a Brazilian post-hardcore/metalcore band formed in 2002 in São Paulo. The band released six studio albums and one live video.

Members

Current members 
 Mi Vieira: unclean vocals (2002 - present)
 Peres Kenji: guitar (2006 - present)
 Thiago Abreu: bass guitar (2016 - present)
 Leandro Ferreira: drums (2016 - present)

Former members 
 Guga: guitar (2002 - 2003)
 Denis Mendes: drums (2002 - 2004)
 Yuri Nishida: clean vocals (2002 - 2005), bass guitar (2002 - 2003), guitar (2003 - 2005)
 Gee Rocha: guitar (2003 - 2006), clean vocals (2005 - 2006)
 Thiba: guitar (2005 - 2006)
 Rafa: drums (2004 - 2007)
 Fil: drums (2007 - 2011)
 Eloy Casagrande: drums (2011)
 Johnny Bonafé: bass guitar (2003 - 2013)
 Ricky Machado: drums (2011 - 2015)
 João Milliet: bass guitar (2013 - 2016)
 Elliot Reis: clean vocals and guitar (2006 - 2020)

Timeline

Discography

Studio albums 
 (2005) O Fim é Uma Certeza
 (2006) Nueva
 (2009) Gloria
(2012) (Re)Nascido
(2018) O Quinto
 (2019) Acima do Céu

Live/video albums 
 (2013) (Re)Nascido em Chamas

Singles

Music videos 
 (2006) Janeiro de 2006
 (2007) Asas Fracas
 (2008) Anemia
 (2008) Asas Fracas
 (2009) Minha Paz
 (2009) Onde Estiver
 (2009) Agora é Minha Vez
 (2010) Tudo Outra Vez
 (2010) Vai Pagar Caro Por Me Conhecer
 (2012) Sangue
 (2012) A Arte de Fazer Inimigos
 (2012) Horizontes (feat. Lucas Silveira)
 (2016) A Cada Dia

Awards

References

External links
 

Brazilian music
Musical groups established in 2002
Brazilian rock music groups
Post-hardcore groups
Screamo musical groups
Metalcore musical groups